Firminy is a commune in the Loire department in central France.

It lies on the river Ondaine, 13 km southwest of Saint-Étienne by rail.

History
The ancient name of the town was Firminiaco or Firminiacus (lit. "place of Firmin"). The name was first recorded in a 971 charter by the King of Burgundy.

Firminy had historically important coalmines known since the 14th century and extensive manufactures of iron, steel, and aluminum goods, including railway material, machinery and cannon. Fancy woolen hosiery was also manufactured.

Population

Sights
Two historic churches from the 12th and 16th centuries are located here. The architect Le Corbusier designed a group of modern buildings, called "Firminy Vert", which includes the Saint-Pierre Church, a stadium, a cultural center, and an Unité d'Habitation.

See also
Communes of the Loire department
Maurice Debesse

References

External links
Official website 

Communes of Loire (department)
Forez